Can't Resist is a single from Scottish band Texas and the second to be taken from their album Red Book. The song was released on 31 October 2005 and reached #13 on the UK Singles Chart.

A free limited edition slip-case was made available by mail to house all three formats.

Track listing

CD1 (9874779)
"Can't Resist" - 3:51
"Say Hello" - 3:02

CD2 (9874784)
"Can't Resist" - 3:51
"I Don't Want a Lover" (Live Acoustic) - 4:14
"Say What You Want" (Live Acoustic) - 3:46
"Can't Resist" (Deadguysuk Mix) - 7:41

DVD Ltd Edition (9874790)
"Can't Resist" (Video) - 3:19
"Call on You" (Audio) - 3:17
"Introducing Red Book" (Interview) - 3:29
"The Abbey Road Acoustic Session" (Video Snippets) - 1:59

Charts

References

2005 singles
2005 songs
Texas (band) songs
Songs written by Johnny McElhone
Songs written by Sharleen Spiteri